The W.E. White Building is a historic commercial building located in downtown Stockton, Illinois, USA. It was constructed in the Queen Anne style in 1897 and designed and built by Peter Schroeder. The building was added to the U.S. National Register of Historic Places in 1997.

History
The W.E. White Building was constructed in 1897, one of many commercial structures erected following a devastating fire in downtown Stockton, Illinois. After the 1896 fire, William and Mary O'Rourke erected a wood-frame dry goods store at the location of the White Building. Mary O'Rourke soon became postmaster and the store Stockton's first post office. In August 1897 a small piece of the downtown lot owned by the O'Rourke's was sold to Wilbur E. White for US$3,500. White moved the old post office and dry goods store to the lot's rear and hired Peter Schroeder, a local architect and builder, to design and erect the W.E. White Building.

Architecture
The W.E. White Building is an example of late 19th century Queen Anne commercial architecture. The red brick building is 25 feet wide by 90 feet long and sits on the northwest corner of Front and Main Street in downtown Stockton. Its main entrance sits diagonally on the building's southeast corner. Multiple elements of Queen Anne style are present on the White Building they include: a projecting cone shaped turret, metal wrapped oriel bay, decorative pediments, a cannonball finial. The building also displays a shift toward Classical influences in its garland swags, classical columns and acanthus leaves.

Historic significance
The late 19th century Queen Anne White Building exemplifies an era of optimism in Stockton as the city strove to rebuild after a destructive fire in 1896. The building is a prominent landmark in downtown Stockton; its architectural features allow it to stand out as one of the most decorative downtown buildings in Stockton. The W.E. White Building was added to the U.S. National Register of Historic Places on November 7, 1997.

References

External links

Property Information Report: W.E. White Building, Illinois Historic Preservation Agency

National Register of Historic Places in Jo Daviess County, Illinois
Commercial buildings completed in 1897
Buildings and structures in Jo Daviess County, Illinois
Commercial buildings on the National Register of Historic Places in Illinois
Queen Anne architecture in Illinois